Kaleva – also known as Kalevi or Kalev – and his sons are important heroic figures in Estonian, Finnish and Karelian mythology. In the Finnish epic the Kalevala, he is an ancient Finnish ruler. In Estonian mythology and Friedrich Reinhold Kreutzwald's epic poem Kalevipoeg, King Kalev was the father of King Kalevipoeg and the husband of Linda.

History
Some historians have suggested that the oldest known written reference to Kaleva (Kalev / Kalevi) can be found in the 6th- or 7th-century Anglo-Saxon poem "Widsith", which was copied into the Exeter Book, a manuscript of Old English poems compiled in the late 10th century. "Widsith" states that

Caesar ruled the Greeks, Caelic the Finns ... I was with the Greeks and Finns and also with Caesar ...

Some historians have interpreted the term "Caelic" to refer to the ancient Finnish ruler Kaleva mentioned in the Kalevala. 

The first clear written references appear in a list of deities published by Mikael Agricola in 1551 and in the Leyen Spiegel by Heinrich Stahl (1641).

The title of Estonia's national epic Kalevipoeg means "Son of Kalev" and the title of the Finnish national epic the Kalevala means "Land of Kaleva". Some have suggested that Kalevala might be the Estonian mainland.

According to the 18th-century Finnish folklore-collector Kristfrid Ganander, Kaleva had twelve sons in total, including Väinämöinen, Ilmarinen and Hiisi.

Myths
In Estonian stories, sons of Kalev were originally considered royalty. In Finnish stories, however, they are more often referred to as giants who built several castles and lived in various regions of Finland. In both cases, they are often blamed for oddities in nature, such as strangely large or weird stones. 

Myths tell that as more and more of the citizens became Christianized, their inhabitants began to hate Kaleva's sons for remaining pagans. Soon, Kaleva's sons were forced to leave their country, Kalevala. As time passed, Christians invaded more and more land, pushing Kaleva's sons further away. Eventually, Kaleva's sons found an island where they stayed. Christian priests came and cursed them, until they took a big stone and sailed away with it. They have not been seen since then, but the legend is that they often appear at night and destroy crops or cut down forests. Similar visitations are attributed to beings known as hiidet (singular hiisi), who resemble trolls. They too were forced to flee by the Christians.

Derived
Finnish people called the star Sirius Kalevan tähti, Kaleva's star.  Orion's Belt was called Kalevan miekka, Kaleva's sword, and swirls in the Milky Way Kalevan porras, Kaleva's step, or Kalevan kynnys, Kaleva's threshold.

Legacy

In paintings
Oskar Kallis, an Estonian painter from the 1900s, produced the Kalevipoeg series of paintings portraying the epic heroic figure Kaleva/Kalevi/Kalev. These paintings are viewable at Kumu art museum in Estonia.

In government
Toompea, a hill in the centre of Tallinn, was said to be the tumulus over his grave, erected by Linda in memory of him. It is now Estonia's centre of government.

In sports

 KK Kalev, a basketball club from Estonia
 JK Tallinna Kalev, a football club from Estonia
 Kalevi Keskstaadion, a stadium in Estonia
 Kalev Sports Hall, an indoor sports hall in Estonia

In toponymy
 Kalevala, Russia, a Karelian town of Uhtua 
 In an old Russian chronicle the Estonian city of Tallinn was called Kolyvan (Estonianized: Kolõvan). It probably meant Kalev city.

See also

 Kalevala
 Legends of Tallinn
 Väinämöinen
 Ilmarinen
 Joukahainen
 Lemminkäinen
 Louhi
 Hiisi

References

External links
 Estonian epic Kalevipoeg

Characters in the Kalevala
Finnish mythology
Kalevipoeg
Mythological kings